Fluda is a genus of jumping spiders that was first described by George and Elizabeth Peckham in 1892.

Species
 it contains eleven species, found only in South America, Panama, and on Trinidad:
Fluda angulosa Simon, 1900 – Venezuela
Fluda araguae Galiano, 1971 – Venezuela
Fluda elata Galiano, 1986 – Ecuador
Fluda goianiae Soares & Camargo, 1948 – Brazil
Fluda inpae Galiano, 1971 – Brazil
Fluda narcissa Peckham & Peckham, 1892 (type) – Brazil
Fluda nigritarsis Simon, 1900 – Venezuela
Fluda opica (Peckham & Peckham, 1892) – Brazil
Fluda perdita (Peckham & Peckham, 1892) – Colombia, Trinidad, Guyana
Fluda princeps Banks, 1929 – Panama
Fluda ruficeps (Taczanowski, 1878) – Peru

References

External links
 Photographs of Fluda species from Brazil

Salticidae
Salticidae genera
Spiders of South America